Puerto Vidal is a corregimiento in Las Palmas District, Veraguas Province, Panama with a population of 1,671 as of 2010. Its population as of 1990 was 1,671; its population as of 2000 was 1,665.

References

Corregimientos of Veraguas Province